Ebrahim Raisi is the eighth President of Iran, which governs during his first term within the thirteenth government of the Islamic Republic of Iran.

Cabinet members

|-

|-
!colspan=7|* Acting
|-

References 

Presidency of Ebrahim Raisi
2021 establishments in Iran
Iran
Raisi
Raisi